Thaiaspis is a genus of proetid trilobite belonging to the  family Phillipsiidae.  Fossils of the various species are found in Middle to Late Mississippian-aged marine strata of eastern Asia, especially of Carboniferous-aged marine strata in Thailand.

References

 Proetida fact sheet 

Carboniferous trilobites
Carboniferous animals of Asia
Philipsidae
Proetida genera